The yellow monitor (Varanus flavescens) or golden monitor is a monitor lizard native to South Asia.

Description

The yellow monitor is a medium-sized monitor, measuring from snout to vent between 45 cm and 95 cm including the tail and weighing up to 1450 gm. It has subcorneal teeth, scarcely compressed. Its snout is short and convex, measuring a little less than the distance from the anterior border of the orbit to the anterior border of the ear; canthus rostralis distinct. Its nostril is an oblique slit, a little nearer to the end of the snout than to the orbit. The digits are short with the length of the fourth toe, measured from its articulation with the tarsus to the base of the claw, not exceeding the length of the femur. The tail of the yellow monitor is feebly compressed and keeled above. The head scales are small and subequal; the median series of supraocular scales slightly dilated transversely. The scales on upper surfaces are moderate, oval and keeled. Abdominal scales are smooth and in 65 to 75 transverse rows. Caudal scales are keeled; the caudal keel with a very low, doubly toothed crest. Adults are olive or yellowish brown above, with irregular darker markings which are generally confluent into broad cross bars; a blackish temporal streak; lower surfaces yellowish, with rather indistinct brown cross bars, which are most distinct on the throat. Young individuals are dark brown above, with yellow spots confluent into crossbars; lower surfaces yellow, with dark brown cross bars.

Distribution and habitat 

The yellow monitor occurs in the flood plains of the Indus, Ganges and Brahmaputra rivers in India, Pakistan, Nepal and Bangladesh. It inhabits wet areas, on the edges of forest and near human settlements and agricultural land. Due to its short hind toes, it is not efficient at climbing trees.

Behaviour and ecology
The yellow monitors thermoregulates by moving between sunny and shady areas, similar to other diurnal lizards. There is also one report of a yellow monitor lying on a pile of hot ash left by a human-lit fire, seemingly to gain heat from it.

It may be capable of play behaviour. A yellow monitor in a wetland was observed alternating between swimming in a vertical position and floating motionlessly.

Threats
Direct killing is the major threat to the yellow monitor. Lack of knowledge about the species among local people is the cause of most of the killing, most of the killing is related to use and trade of the skin. Ignorance is a root issue, with no campaign to spread awareness or education of the local people is being conducted. Creation of protected areas is insufficient for the species as most of its potential habitat lies outside the protected areas, and it is often found close to human settlement; this increases the threat to the species.
In Nepal, its skin has been offered for sale in wildlife markets.

Conservation
The yellow monitor is protected in all range countries except Pakistan, Nepal, India, Bhutan and Bangladesh.
The actual population or population trends are unknown. However, the yellow monitor has low population density even in its preferred habitat. Limited studies suggest that the species is decreasing, however more studies are required to confirm actual trend of the species.

References

 Auffenberg W.  Rahman H.  Iffat F.  Perveen Z. 1989 A STUDY OF VARANUS-FLAVESCENS HARDWICKE AND Gray (SAURIA VARANIDAE). Journal of the Bombay Natural History Society 86 (3): 286–307
 
 Whitaker, R. 1981 Bangladesh - Monitors and turtles Hamadryad 6 (3): 7-9

External links
 

Varanus
Reptiles of Bangladesh
Reptiles of India
Reptiles of Nepal
Reptiles of Pakistan
Reptiles described in 1827
Taxa named by Thomas Hardwicke
Taxa named by John Edward Gray